Obie Burnett "O. B." McClinton (April 25, 1940 – September 23, 1987) was an American black country music singer and songwriter. The second-youngest child born to Rev. G. A. McClinton, a clergyman and farmer who owned a  ranch near Memphis, Tennessee.  Listening to Hank Williams as a child around the age of nine or 10 sparked his interest in performing country music.

Before beginning his country music career, he tried to break into R&B.  Although he was unable to secure a recording contract as a soul singer himself, he did pen several songs recorded by James Carr, including the title songs to Carr's albums You Got My Mind Messed Up and A Man Needs a Woman.

Known to refer to himself as the "Chocolate Cowboy", McClinton successfully marketed his album called The Only One on television long before the practice was commonplace.  Featuring his first country chart single "Don't Let The Green Grass Fool You", a top 40 song in 1972, he considered it to be his finest work.

He died on September 23, 1987, after a year-long battle with abdominal cancer.

Discography

Albums

Singles 

† "Oboe"
± "Oboe with The Keys"
‡ "O.B. McClinton (The Chocolate Cowboy)"

References

External links
McClinton, O. B.

1940 births
1987 deaths
People from Senatobia, Mississippi
American country singer-songwriters
African-American male singer-songwriters
Singer-songwriters from Mississippi
Place of death missing
Deaths from cancer
African-American country musicians
Country musicians from Mississippi
20th-century African-American male singers